William Russell Enoch (born 19 November 1924) is an English actor. He achieved prominence in 1956 when he took the title role in the ITV television series The Adventures of Sir Lancelot (1956–1957). In 1963, he became part of the original lead cast of BBC1's Doctor Who, playing the role of schoolteacher Ian Chesterton opposite William Hartnell from the show's first episode until 1965. Russell's film roles include parts in The Man Who Never Was (1956), The Great Escape (1963) and Superman (1978). On television, he notably appeared as Ted Sullivan in Coronation Street in 1992. In recent years, Russell has maintained his association with Doctor Who; he returned to the show in 2022, making a cameo appearance as Ian in "The Power of the Doctor", 57 years after the character's last television appearance.

Early life
William Russell Enoch was born on 19 November 1924 in Sunderland, County Durham, to Eva Compston (née Pile) and Alfred James Enoch. He was educated at Wolverhampton Grammar School and became interested in acting at an early age. He was involved in organising entertainment during his national service in the Royal Air Force and then, after university, went into repertory theatre.

Doctor Who
In 1963, Russell was cast in Doctor Who as science teacher Ian Chesterton, the Doctor's first male companion, appearing in most episodes of the first two seasons of the programme.

He was one of the four original cast members of Doctor Who, starring opposite William Hartnell as the First Doctor, Jacqueline Hill as Barbara Wright, Carole Ann Ford as Susan Foreman and later Maureen O'Brien as Vicki. His first involvement in the series took the form of the untransmitted pilot episode, which was eventually reshot and broadcast as An Unearthly Child. He eventually departed, alongside Hill, in the penultimate story of the second season, The Chase.

He was intended to reprise the role of Ian in the 1983 story Mawdryn Undead alongside Peter Davison as the Fifth Doctor. However, scheduling conflicts made him unavailable.

Since leaving Coronation Street in 1992, Russell has maintained his association with Doctor Who, having lent his voice as a narrator to several of the audiobook releases of the lost 1960s episodes. He appeared in The Game, one of the continuing Doctor Who audio stories produced by Big Finish Productions. He has also recorded readings for some of the CD audio adaptations of Doctor Who story novelisations originally published by Target Books.

In 1999, Russell returned to the role of Ian for the VHS release of the story The Crusade, of which the second and fourth episodes are lost. He recorded several in-character scenes to camera, which helped to bridge the gaps between the existing episodes.

Russell has also contributed to the Doctor Who DVD range, having participated in several audio commentaries and on-screen interviews since 2002.

In 2013, the BBC produced An Adventure in Space and Time, a docudrama depicting the creation and early days of Doctor Who, as part of the programme's fiftieth anniversary celebrations. Russell appeared as a character in the drama, portrayed by actor Jamie Glover. He himself had a cameo role, playing a BBC Commissionaire named Harry.

The same year, Russell portrayed both Ian and the First Doctor in the Big Finish audio play The Light at the End, produced to celebrate the fiftieth anniversary, making him, aged 88, the oldest ever person to portray the Doctor, a record he held until March 2023, when Tom Baker portrayed the Fourth Doctor in the Big Finish audio series The Fourth Doctor Adventures at the age of 89.

Russell made a cameo appearance as Ian in the 2022 special "The Power of the Doctor". With this appearance, he achieved the Guinness World Record for the longest gap between TV appearances.

Personal life
In 1953, Russell married Balbina Gutierrez. They had three children, Robert, Laetitia and Vanessa, and later divorced.

On 2 December 1988, 64-year-old Russell and his second wife, Etheline Margareth Lewis, a Barbadian Brazilian doctor, had their first child together, Alfred Enoch. Alfred is an actor, best known for playing Dean Thomas in the Harry Potter film series and Wes Gibbins in the ABC television series How to Get Away with Murder.

According to Janet Fielding, speaking at a cast interview for "The Power of the Doctor", one of Russell's daughters was with him on the set since he had, sometime prior to his return to Doctor Who in 2022, been diagnosed with dementia.

Filmography

Film
Russell appeared in British films from 1950 onwards, appearing in well-known productions such as They Who Dare (1954), One Good Turn (1955), The Man Who Never Was (1956) and The Great Escape (1963). Later, he had minor roles in Terror (1978), Superman (1978) and Death Watch (1979) with Harvey Keitel and Harry Dean Stanton.

Television
His big break was the title role in The Adventures of Sir Lancelot on ITV in 1956, which for sale to the American NBC network became the first UK television series to be shot in colour. Russell has acted in many plays and TV series including Disraeli, Testament of Youth and the part of Ted Sullivan, the short-lived second husband of Rita Sullivan in Coronation Street. He also had a small part in an episode of The Black Adder, as a late replacement for Wilfrid Brambell, who had become impatient with delays to his scene and left the set before shooting it, and appeared as the Duke of Gloucester in the Robin of Sherwood episode "The Pretender". Other roles include Lanscombe in an episode of the 2005 series of Agatha Christie's Poirot ("After the Funeral").

Audio drama

Theatre
Russell has played a number of roles in theatre with the Royal Shakespeare Company, the National Theatre and in the opening season of the Globe Theatre. In the 1980s, while a member of the Actors' Touring Company, he used the stage name Russell Enoch; on leaving the company he reverted to the name William Russell.

References

External links

1924 births
20th-century English male actors
20th-century Royal Air Force personnel
21st-century English male actors
Actors from County Durham
Audiobook narrators
English male film actors
English male stage actors
English male television actors
Living people
People from Sunderland
Male actors from Tyne and Wear
People with dementia
People educated at Wolverhampton Grammar School